Street Tough is a studio album by Ben E. King, his final album released directly with Atlantic Records.  It was released in 1981. King worked with his son, Ben Jr., on some of the tracks.

Singles

Two singles were released from the album. "Street Tough" backed with "Why Is the Question" came out first, followed by "You Made the Difference in My Life" backed with "Souvenirs of Love", both in 1981.

Track listing
"Street Tough" (Willie Hutch) [4:28]
"Made for Each Other" (Barrie Palmer, Janet Alhanti) [4:44]
"Staying Power" (Frederick Knight) [4:41]
"Stay Awhile With Me" (Joe Cobb, Van McCoy) [5:31]
"Why Is The Question" (Ben E. King) [4:28]
"You Made The Difference To My Life" (Barrie Palmer, Janet Alhanti) [5:39]
"Souvenirs of Love" (Barrie Palmer, Janet Alhanti) [3:44]
"Something To Be Loved" (Michael Terence Ward) [5:25]

References

External links
 

Ben E. King albums
1981 albums
Atlantic Records albums